"Aqua Boogie (A Psychoalphadiscobetabioaquadoloop)" is a song by funk band Parliament.  The track was released from their 1978 album, Motor Booty Affair.  The song describes being compelled to learn to swim despite the persistent fear of water and drowning, comparing it to the reluctance to dance.

Background
The track features lead vocals by George Clinton, Garry Shider, Ray Davis, and newly recruited member Walter "Junie" Morrison. It is one of the last P-Funk tracks written by core members Clinton, bassist Bootsy Collins, and keyboardist Bernie Worrell.

Personnel
Lead vocals-George Clinton, Garry Shider, Ray Davis, Walter Morrison, Ramond Spruell (bird calls)
Guitars-Garry Shider, Bootsy Collins, Phelps Collins
Keyboards-Bernie Worrell
Drums-Gary Mudbone Cooper
Background vocals-: George Clinton, Gary Shider, Ray Davis, Debbie Wright, Walter Morrison, Jeanette Washington, Mallia Franklin, Shirley Hayden, Cheryl James, Lynn Mabry, Dawn Silva, Linda Brown, Richard "Kush" Griffith, Raymond Spruell, Mike "Clip" Payne, Joey Zalabok, Robert "P-Nut" Johnson, Larry Heckstall, Overton Loyd

Chart performance
"Aqua Boogie (A Psychoalphadiscobetabioaquadoloop)" spent four weeks at number one on the R&B singles chart during the winter of 1979.  However, it was not as successful on the Billboard Hot 100 singles chart, only peaking at number 89.

References

1979 singles
Parliament (band) songs
Songs written by George Clinton (funk musician)
Casablanca Records singles
Songs written by Bootsy Collins
Songs written by Bernie Worrell